Chapter and Verse is the seventh and final full-length album by British post-hardcore band Funeral for a Friend, released on 19 January 2015. This is the first album released by Funeral for a Friend since 2007's Tales Don't Tell Themselves not to be produced by Romesh Dodangoda, who had produced the band's last three albums starting with 2008's Memory and Humanity.

Release and promotion
On their 2014 tour, Funeral for a Friend incorporated the song "1%" into their set list. The band then debuted the first single from the album, "You've Got a Bad Case of the Religions", on the Rock Show on BBC Radio 1 on 28 September 2014. They announced the title of the album, as well as its release date and a 2015 tour in support of the album the next day.

Chapter and Verse would become the band's final album, as they confirmed on 14 September 2015 that they would be breaking up following a final tour in 2016.

Track listing

Recording personnel

Funeral for a Friend
 Matthew Davies – lead vocals
 Kris Coombs-Roberts – guitar, backing vocals
 Gavin Burrough – guitar, backing vocals
 Pat Lundy – drums, percussion
 Richard Boucher – bass guitar

Lewis Johns - Producer

References

Funeral for a Friend albums
2015 albums